Burry Inlet and Loughor Estuary
is a Site of Special Scientific Interest in Carmarthen,  Wales.

See also 

List of SSSIs in Carmarthenshire

References 

Sites of Special Scientific Interest in Carmarthen & Dinefwr
Coast of Carmarthenshire